Častotice is a village, part of Zahrádka in Třebíč District of Vysočina Region, Czech Republic. In 2011, the village had population of 50 and in 2009, the village had 20 houses. The village was founded in 1353. It is also known for its store of Dominant CZ, which is one of the most important stores of this company.

Geography
The area of Častotice is located in Vysočina Region in Třebíč District. At the north, it neighbors with Zahrádka, at the east with Ocmanice, at
the south with Okarec and at the west with Studenec and Pyšel. Significant part of Častotice is occupied by ponds; Nový or Častotický (5,7 ha) at the northeast, Dubovec (31 ha) and Stejskal (15 ha) on the south. In Častotice, there is a stream with the same name, starting next to Pyšel and flows into Dubovec, together with Maršovecký stream, which starts next to Studenec, and Hranečnický stream, starting from pond named Hranečník at the east of Pozďatín.

The elevation in the center of the village is 420 m, at the northwest the elevation increases and reaches 460 m. Častotice is about a kilometer south of Zahrádka. The village is connected with the E461 road (I/23).

References 

Villages in Třebíč District